Trichaulax may refer to:
 Trichaulax (beetle), a genus of insects in the family Scarabaeidae
 Trichaulax (plant), a genus of flowering plants in the family Acanthaceae